A mythical being may refer to:
Legendary creature
Mythology
List of mythological creatures

See also
:Category:Mythological peoples